The 1937 Virginia gubernatorial election was held on November 2, 1937. James Hubert Price, incumbent lieutenant governor and former member of the Virginia House of Delegates, was nominated by the Democratic Party to run against the Republican nominee, former state senator John Powell Royall.

Candidates
James H. Price (D), Virginia State Delegate from 1916-1930, who defeated Vivian L. Page.
J. Powell Royall (R), Virginia State Senator from 1912-1920

Results

References

Gubernatorial
1937
Virginia
November 1937 events